Vadim Shishkin (born 4 March 1969) is a Ukrainian chess grandmaster. He is the 2019 World Senior Chess Champion.

Shishkin earned FIDE titles, International Master (IM) in 1995 and Grandmaster (GM) in 2007. He won the 2019 World Senior Chess Championship 50+ category held in Bucharest, Romania.

References

External links 

 

1969 births
Living people
Ukrainian chess players
Chess grandmasters